The 2007 Indonesia Open Super Series (officially known as the Djarum Indonesia Open Super Series 2007 for sponsorship reasons) was a badminton tournament which took place at the Istora Gelora Bung Karno in Jakarta, Indonesia, from 7 to 13 May 2007 and had a total purse of $250,000.

Tournament 
The 2007 Indonesia Open Super Series was the sixth tournament of the 2007 BWF Super Series and also part of the Indonesia Open championships, which had been held since 1982.

Venue 
This international tournament was held at the Istora Gelora Bung Karno in Jakarta, Indonesia.

Point distribution 
Below is the point distribution for each phase of the tournament based on the BWF points system for the BWF Super Series event.

Prize money 
The total prize money for this tournament was US$250,000. Distribution of prize money was in accordance with BWF regulations.

Men's singles

Seeds 

 Lin Dan (withdrew)
 Bao Chunlai (final)
 Chen Jin (first round)
 Chen Hong (semi-finals)
 Lee Chong Wei (champion)
 Chen Yu (withdrew)
 Peter Gade (quarter-finals)
 Kenneth Jonassen (second round)

Finals

Top half

Section 1

Section 2

Bottom half

Section 3

Section 4

Women's singles

Seeds 

 Xie Xingfang (second round)
 Zhang Ning (quarter-finals)
 Zhu Lin (final)
 Lu Lan (second round)
 Huaiwen Xu (quarter-finals)
 Jiang Yanjiao (withdrew)
 Pi Hongyan (semi-finals)
 Wang Chen (champion)

Finals

Top half

Section 1

Section 2

Bottom half

Section 3

Section 4

Men's doubles

Seeds 

 Fu Haifeng / Cai Yun (champions)
 Jens Eriksen / Martin Lundgaard Hansen (second round)
 Markis Kido / Hendra Setiawan (quarter-finals)
 Candra Wijaya /  Tony Gunawan (semi-finals)
 Koo Kien Keat / Tan Boon Heong (semi-finals)
 Choong Tan Fook / Lee Wan Wah (quarter-finals)
 Jung Jae-sung / Lee Jae-jin (second round)
 Rian Sukmawan / Eng Hian (first round)

Finals

Top half

Section 1

Section 2

Bottom half

Section 3

Section 4

Women's doubles

Seeds 

 Zhang Yawen / Wei Yili (quarter-finals)
 Chien Yu-chin / Cheng Wen-hsing (first round)
 Lee Kyung-won / Lee Hyo-jung (quarter-finals)
 Wong Pei Tty / Chin Eei Hui (quarter-finals)
 Gao Ling / Zhang Jiewen (semi-finals)
 Greysia Polii / Vita Marissa (second round)
 Jiang Yanmei / Li Yujia (quarter-finals)
 Aki Akao / Tomomi Matsuda (first round)

Finals

Top half

Section 1

Section 2

Bottom half

Section 3

Section 4

Mixed doubles

Seeds 

 Nova Widianto / Liliyana Natsir (final)
 Xie Zhongbo / Zhang Yawen (quarter-finals)
 Sudket Prapakamol / Saralee Thungthongkam (second round)
 Nathan Robertson / Gail Emms (second round)
 Zheng Bo / Gao Ling (champions)
 He Hanbin / Yu Yang (semi-finals)
 Flandy Limpele / Vita Marissa (first round)
 Anthony Clark / Donna Kellogg (quarter-finals)

Finals

Top half

Section 1

Section 2

Bottom half

Section 3

Section 4

References

External links 
Tournament Link

Indonesia Open (badminton)
Indonesia Super Series, 2007
Sports competitions in Jakarta
Indonesia